Montréal-Verdun was a former provincial electoral district in the Montreal region of Quebec, Canada that elected members to the Legislative Assembly of Quebec.

It was created for the 1923 election from part of Jacques-Cartier electoral district.  Its final election was in 1962.  It disappeared in the 1966 election and its successor electoral district was Verdun.

Members of the Legislative Assembly
 Pierre-Auguste Lafleur, Conservative Party - Union Nationale (1923–1939)
 Joseph-Jean-Léopold Comeau, Liberal (1939–1944)
 Lionel-Alfred Ross, Liberal (1944–1960)
 George O'Reilly, Liberal (1960–1964)
 Claude Wagner, Liberal (1964–1966)

Election results

|}

|}

|}

|}

|}

|}

|}

|}

|}

|}

|}

|}

|}

References
 Election results (National Assembly)
 Election results (QuebecPolitique.com)

Former provincial electoral districts of Quebec